Viggo Lindstrøm (12 January 1858 – 17 June 1926) was a Danish actor and theatre director, founder of Det Ny Teater in Copenhagen. He was married to the actress Vera Lindstrøm.

Biography

Lindstrøm was born on 12 January 1858  in Copenhagen, the son of a Swedish tailor, and first apprenticed as a wine merchant before turning to acting. He had his debut on 3 December 1880  in Stavanger and was then affiliated to Dagmarteatret for many years from its opening, before he moved on to Folketeatret where he was expected to succeed J. F. S. Dorph-Petersen as theatre director. However, a fashionable controversy with Dorph-Petersen regarding his wife's notice from the theatre prompted him to resign.

He was then hired by a development company, Bona, to head the establishment of Det Ny Teater. On its opening in 1908, it was the second largest and most advanced theatre in Denmark but he left after three years due to an insignificant debt.

That same year he had his debut on film and after that appeared sporadically in films from various companies. In the first half of 1920 he worked for Nordisk Film and had minor roles in two Carl Theodor Dreyer films, Leaves from Satan's Book (produced 1919, released 1921) and Master of the House (1925).

Active until his death in 1926, his two last appearances were in Ole & Axel films for the Palladium production company. He is buried in Frederiksberg Cemetery.

Films
 Vildmanden (1908)
 Den farlige leg (1911)
 En behagelig fejltagelse (1912)
 Det berygtede hus (1912)
 Hjertedoktoren (1913)
 Buddhas Øje (1915)
 Amors Spilopper (1916)
 Blade af Satans bog (1919)
 Gudernes Yndling (1920)
 Hans gode Genius (1922)
 Jafet, der søger sig en Fader I - IV (1922)
 Den sidste af Slægten (1922)
 Smil og taarer (1923)
 Grønkøbings glade gavtyve (1925)
 Du skal ære din hustru (1925)
 Den store Magt (1925)
 Ulvejægerne (1926)

See also
 Cinema of Denmark

References

Danish male stage actors
Danish male film actors
Danish male silent film actors
20th-century Danish male actors
Male actors from Copenhagen
Danish people of Swedish descent
1858 births
1926 deaths